Andrew Noel Omondi Amonde (born 25 December 1983) is a Kenyan rugby union player and television producer. He plays for Kenya's national sevens team and has been its captain since 2012. Amonde captained Kenya's Olympic sevens team at the 2016 Summer Olympics.

Volleyballer Mercy Moim and Amonde were chosen to be Kenya's flagbearers at the Olympics opening ceremony in Tokyo (Moim was the second woman to be given this honour following archer Shazad Anwar in 2016).

References

External links 
 
 
 
 

1983 births
Living people
Kenyan rugby union players
Male rugby sevens players
Rugby sevens players at the 2016 Summer Olympics
Olympic rugby sevens players of Kenya
Kenya international rugby sevens players
Rugby sevens players at the 2020 Summer Olympics
People from Nyeri County